DCappella is an a cappella group formed via a national search and run by Disney Music Group featuring Disney songs. The group originally consisted of Antonio Fernandez, Joe Santoni, Morgan Keene, Orlando Dixon, RJ Woessner, Shelley Regner, and Sojourner Brown: it currently consists of Fernandez, Santoni, Keene, Dixon, and Kalen Kelly. Deke Sharon is DCappella’s co-creator, music director, arranger and producer.

History
DCappella was conceived in 2012 with auditions starting in November 2017. Then it was announced in December 2017 as being formed by Disney Music Group through a nationwide search for talent run by Deke Sharon. Plans at the time was for a seven member group, soprano, mezzo, alto, tenor, high baritone, low bass and vocal percussionist. On April 29, 2018, the seven members were confirmed to be Newsies star Morgan Keene as the soprano, Pitch Perfect star Shelley Regner as the mezzo, Tony Awards performer Sojourner Brown as the alto, Saturday Night Live performer RJ Woessner as the tenor, The Voice finalist Orlando Dixon as the baritone, Hunkapella member Joe Santoni as the bass, and American Music Machine member Antonio Fernandez as the vocal percussionist. In January 2018, a list of 14 member was released, as at the time, Disney planned for two separate touring teams within DCappella group.

Disney Music released the group's first single, "Immortals" from Disney's "Big Hero 6" on April 27, 2018. DCappella made its first appearance on American Idol's Disney Night April 29, 2018. The group gave its first concert performance over Memorial Day weekend 2018 as the opening act to Disney's Beauty and the Beast Live in Concert at the Hollywood Bowl along with ABC's first Idol winner Maddie Poppe. The group's debut self titled album was released on November 16, 2018.

DCappella's first tour started in Jacksonville, Florida, in January 2019 and ended two months later in Oakland, California. Regner was replaced as mezzo by Kalen Kelly in May 2019. On October 25, 2019, they released their first holiday album called Rockin Holiday. In March 2020, Brown was replaced by Kelly Denice Taylor.
Taylor left the group on May 9, 2022 and Woessner left on February 20, 2023.

Members
Vocal percussion
Antonio Fernandez
Bass
Joe Santoni
Soprano
Morgan Keene 
Baritone
Orlando Dixon
Mezzo
Shelley Regner (April 29, 2018–May 22, 2019)
Kalen Kelly (May 22, 2019–)
Alto
Sojourner Brown (April 29, 2018–March 18, 2020)
Kelly Denice Taylor (March 20, 2020–May 9, 2022)
Tenor
 RJ Woessner (April 29, 2018-February 20, 2023)

Timeline

Lineup

Music

Albums
All music are arranged by Deke Sharon

Singles
{{Track listing
| headline = Singles
| extra_column = On album (Released)
| total_length = 
| all_writing = 
| all_lyrics = 
| all_music = 
| title1 = Immortals
| note1 = from Big Hero 6
| writer1 = 
| lyrics1 = 
| music1 = 
| extra1 = DCappella (April 27, 2018)
| length1 = 3:42
| title2 = How Far I'll Go
| note2 = from Moana
| writer2 = Lin-Manuel Miranda
| lyrics2 = 
| music2 = 
| extra2 = DCappella (August 10, 2018)
| length2 = 2:42
| title3 = Trashin' the Camp
| note3 = from Tarzan
| writer3 = Phil Collins
| lyrics3 = 
| music3 = 
| extra3 = DCappella (September 28, 2018)
| length3 = 2:03
| title4 = Last Christmas
| note4 = 
| writer4 = George Michael
| lyrics4 = 
| music4 = 
| extra4 = (September 28, 2018)
| length4 = 3:20
| title5 = All I Want for Christmas Is You
| note5 = 
| writer5 = 
| lyrics5 = 
| music5 = 
| extra5 = (September 28, 2018)
| length5 = 3:47
| title6 = Part of Your World
| note6 = from The Little Mermaid
| writer6 = 
| lyrics6 = 
| music6 = 
| extra6 = DCappella (February 15, 2019)
| length6 = 3:01
| title7 = Ready for This
| note7 = features JD McCrary
| writer7 = 
| lyrics7 = 
| music7 = 
| extra7 = (August 2, 2019)
| length7 = 1:14
| title8 = Speechless
| note8 = from Aladdin
| writer8 = 
| lyrics8 = 
| music8 = 
| extra8 = (September 6, 2019)
| length8 = 3:24
| title9 = Circle of Life/He Lives in You
| note9 = from The Lion King/The Lion King II: Simba's Pride
| writer9 = 
| lyrics9 = 
| music9 = 
| extra9 = (October 11, 2019)
| length9 = 3:38
| title10 = I See the Light
| note10 = from Tangled
| writer10 = 
| lyrics10 = 
| music10 = 
| extra10 = (November 8, 2019)
| length10 = 3:08
| title11 = Get'cha Head in the Game
| note11 = from High School Musical
| writer11 = 
| lyrics11 = 
| music11 = 
| extra11 = (December 6, 2019)
| length11 = 2:21
| title12 = Ev'rybody Wants to Be a Cat
| note12 = from The Aristocats
| writer12 = 
| lyrics12 = 
| music12 = 
| extra12 = (January 10, 2020)
| length12 = 2:40
| title13 = I Just Can't Wait to Be King
| note13 = from The Lion King
| writer13 = 
| lyrics13 = 
| music13 = 
| extra13 = (February 7, 2020)
| length13 = 2:24
| title14 = I'll Make a Man Out of You
| note14 = from Mulan (1998 film)
| writer14 = 
| lyrics14 = 
| music14 = 
| extra14 = (February 28, 2020)
| length14 = 3:08
| title15 = All I Want
| note15 = from High School Musical: The Musical: The Series
| writer15 = Olivia Rodrigo
| lyrics15 = 
| music15 = 
| extra15 = (March 27, 2020)
| length15 = 3:02
| title16 = I2I
| note16 = from A Goofy Movie
| writer16 = Patrick Deremer & Roy Freeland
| lyrics16 = 
| music16 = 
| extra16 = (April 10, 2020)
| length16 = 2:57
| title17 = Into the Unknown
| note17 = from Frozen II
| writer17 = Kristen Anderson-Lopez·Robert Lopez
| lyrics17 = 
| music17 = 
| extra17 = (April 24, 2020)
| length17 = 2:43
| title18 = You're Welcome (song)
| note18 = from Moana
| writer18 = Lin-Manuel Miranda
| lyrics18 = 
| music18 = 
| extra18 = (May 15, 2020)
| length18 = 2:43
| title19 = Hawaiian Roller Coaster Ride
| note19 = from Lilo & Stitch
| writer19 = Mark Kealiʻi Hoʻomalu
| lyrics19 = 
| music19 = 
| extra19 = (June 10, 2020)
| length19 = 2:49
| title20 = Just Around the Riverbend/Colors of the Wind
| note20 = from Pocahontas (1995 film)
| writer20 = 
| lyrics20 = 
| music20 = 
| extra20 = (June 19, 2020)
| length20 = 4:35
| title21 = Go the Distance
| note21 = from Hercules
| writer21 = 
| lyrics21 = 
| music21 = 
| extra21 = (September 4, 2020)
| length21 = 2:43
| title22 = The Nightmare Before Christmas Medley
| note22 = from The Nightmare Before Christmas
| writer22 = Danny Elfman
| lyrics22 = 
| music22 = 
| extra22 = (October 2, 2020)
| length22 = 3:05
}}

Appearances and presentations
 American Idol (ABC) Disney Night, April 29, 2018 performing Disney Medley
 Disney's Beauty and the Beast Live in Concert (Hollywood Bowl) Memorial Day weekend of May 28, 2018 opening actThe Wonderful World of Disney: Magical Holiday Celebration (ABC) Thursday, November 29, 2019Disney Parks Magical Christmas Day Parade (ABC) December 25, 2019 performing "Last Christmas"
 Total Vocal fifth annual concert (Carnegie Hall) March 24, 2019

Tours
 Live A Cappella Concert Experience (January to March 2019) US, 40 stops in about two months with a special “Friend Like Me” Meet and Greet Experience packages
 National tour (August to September 2019) Japan, 9 stops

Awards

|-
!colspan="5" align="center"| A Cappella Video Awards (AVA)
|-
|rowspan=5| 2019
|rowspan=5|  "Immortals"
| Best Rock Video
| 
|
|-
| Outstanding Special/Visual Effects
| 
|rowspan=4| 
|-
| Outstanding Video Editing
| 
|-
|Best Soundtrack Video
| 
|-
| Best Video by a Professional Group
| 
|-
!colspan="5" align="center"| Contemporary A Cappella Recording Awards (CARA)
|-
|rowspan=4| 2019
| Deke Sharon for "Immortals"
| Best Professional Arrangement for a Non-Scholastic Group
| 
|rowspan=4| 
|-
| DCappella''
| Contemporary A Cappella Recording Awards (CARA) Best Debut Album
| 
|-
| "Immortals"
| Contemporary A Cappella Recording Awards (CARA) Best Rock Song
| 
|-
| "The Glory Days"
| Contemporary A Cappella Recording Awards (CARA) Best Soundtrack Song
|

References

External links

, PR website

American vocal groups
Professional a cappella groups
Musical groups established in 2018
Walt Disney Records artists
2018 establishments in the United States